Wrexham County Borough Museum (or simply Wrexham Museum) is a local history museum in Wrexham, Wrexham County Borough, Wales. It is located within County Buildings, alongside the A. N. Palmer Centre for Local Studies and Archives and a proposed Football Museum for Wales. The building is located on Regent Street, in the city centre. The museum is managed by the Wrexham Heritage & Archives Service, which in turn, is operated by Wrexham County Borough Council as part of its Housing & Economy Department.

History 

The museum is housed in County Buildings on Regent Street, in Wrexham's city centre. The building, designed by Thomas Penson, was a former militia barracks and later a police station and Magistrates' court. The police vacated the building in 1976–1977, and it became part of a local art college.

In 1996, following the formation of Wrexham County Borough, the local council set up a museum in the then vacant building. The museum is managed by the Wrexham Heritage & Archives Service, part of Wrexham County Borough Council's Housing & Economy Department. The archives are regarded to be part of the museum, but were named in honour of local historian Alfred Neobard Palmer, as the A. N. Palmer Centre for Local Studies and Archives, and opened in 2002.

In 2009, the museum was awarded a £950,000 grant from the Heritage Lottery Fund to open up more of the building to display the museum's collections. In 2010–2011, a glass extension was added to the front of the building, as well as a museum-wide refurbishment, reopening on 14 February 2011.

Description 
The museum focuses on the history of Wrexham and the wider County Borough area. Touring national and local exhibitions are also featured at the museum at various events. The museum houses a Courtyard Cafe and a shop. It is walking distance from Wrexham bus station, Central and General railway stations, with a multi-storey car park at the rear. Wrexham Cathedral is adjacent to the building's west.

The Football Museum Wales project, backed by Wrexham County Borough Council and the Welsh Government, hopes to set up a national football museum in the building alongside Wrexham Museum, on the building's upper floor.

Galleries and collections 
The museum hosts over 16,000 objects, with not all available to view at the same time, however any object can be requested to the museum to view in-person at an appointed time.

The museum contains three exhibitions, described as 'galleries'. Gallery One is focused on the archaeology and social history of Wrexham County Borough. Gallery Two is centred on various collections of Amgueddfa Cymru – National Museum Wales and the National Library of Wales. Gallery Three is used for various other programmes, including touring exhibitions in the museum for a limited period. This included an Ancient Egyptian touring exhibition from the British Museum in 2015, and an exhibition on the Roman history of Holt in 2021.

The museum also hosts an attraction known as the "Time Tunnel".

Notable collections in the museum relating to aspects of the local history include: Wales Football collection, the local coal, iron and steel industries, and the brick, tile and terracotta industry.

References

1996 establishments in Wales
Museums established in 1996
Museums in Wrexham County Borough